Susulus is a genus of stoneflies from the Perlodidae family.

Species
Susulus includes the following species:
Susulus venustus (Jewett, 1965)

References

Perlodidae
Plecoptera genera